Saint John the Baptist as a Boy may refer to:

Saint John the Baptist as a Boy (Andrea del Sarto)
Saint John the Baptist as a Boy (Raphael)
The Infant Saint John the Baptist (Rosso Fiorentino)
Saint John the Baptist as a Boy (Wautier)